Š Nuoraid Magaziidna (Š Youth Magazine), typically referred to simply as Š, is a Sámi bimonthly magazine focused on music, movies, sports, and youth culture. It is distributed for free to eighth-grade students across Norway, as well as to students studying Sámi languages. The magazine is active on both Facebook and Instagram.

References

External links
 Š website

1993 establishments in Norway
Magazines established in 1993
Northern Sámi-language magazines
Sámi in Norway
Sámi magazines
Youth magazines
Bi-monthly magazines published in Norway